"Forever 1" is a song recorded by South Korean girl group Girls' Generation for their seventh studio album of the same name. It was released as the album's lead single by SM Entertainment on August 5, 2022.

Background and release
On May 17, 2022, SM Entertainment announced Girls' Generation would be returning for their fifteenth anniversary with a new album in August, ending their five year hiatus. On July 4, member Sooyoung teased on tvN's Take Care of Me This Week that the group would be releasing their seventh studio album. On July 25, SM Entertainment announced they would be releasing their seventh studio album titled Forever 1 on August 8. A day later, the promotional schedule was released with the digital version announced to be released three days earlier on August 5 to commemorate the fifteenth anniversary. On July 27, it was announced that Forever 1 would contains ten tracks including the lead single "Forever 1", on which songwriter Kenzie, who previously worked with the group for their singles "Into The New World" (2007), "Oh!" (2010), and "All Night" (2017), announced to be participating in the single's production. The music video teasers was released on July 4–5. The song was released alongside the album and its music video on August 5. The remix EP by Matisse & Sadko, Aiobahn, and Mar Vista, titled iScreaM Vol. 19: Forever 1 Remixes, was released on November 17.

Composition
"Forever 1" was written, composed, and arranged by Kenzie alongside Ylva Dimberg for the composition, and Moonshine for the arrangement. It was described as dance-pop song with "energetic melody", "exciting festival-like atmosphere", and "refreshing vibe for the summer" with lyrics about "eternal love for precious people who give strength anytime and anywhere" that "alternate between a playful love song and a celebration of the group's longstanding relationship with each other" and contains the meaning of "let's be forever". "Forever 1" was composed in the key of A major, with a tempo of 124 beats per minute.

Music video
The music video directed by Shin Hee-won was released alongside the song by SM Entertainment on August 5, 2022. The music video portrays the members "living the high life such as flying on private jets, riding in limousines, being bombarded by paparazzi, DJing at clubs" with scenes that switches between their high life and them "performing together in tightly choreographed scenes on a cruise ship and a colorful parade float".

The music video was chosen as one of the best K-pop videos of the year by Teen Vogue.

Commercial performance
"Forever 1" debuted at number 75 on South Korea's Circle Digital Chart in the chart issue dated July 31 – August 6, 2022; on its component charts, the song debuted at number 11 on the Circle Download Chart, number 113 on the Circle Streaming Chart, and number 32 on the Circle BGM Chart. It ascended to number five on the Circle Digital Chart, number four on the Circle Download Chart, and the Circle Streaming Chart in the chart issue dated August 21–27, 2022. The song also debuted at number three on the Billboard South Korea Songs in the chart issue dated August 20, 2022.

In Japan, "Forever 1" debuted at number 56 on the Billboard Japan Hot 100 in the chart issue dated August 17, 2022; on its component charts, the song debuted at number 47 on the Top Download Songs, and number 83 on the Top Streaming Songs. In Singapore, the song debuted at number seven on the RIAS Top Streaming Chart, and number four on the RIAS Top Regional Chart in the chart issue dated August 5–11, 2022. The song also debuted at number six on the Billboard Singapore Songs in the chart issue dated August 20, 2022. In Malaysia, the song debuted at number eight on the Billboard Malaysia Songs in the chart issue dated August 20, 2022. In Indonesia, the song debuted at number 14 on the Billboard Indonesia Songs in the chart issue dated August 20, 2022. In Hong Kong, the song debuted at number 13 on the Billboard Hong Kong Songs in the chart issue dated August 20, 2022. In Taiwan, the song debuted at number four on the Billboard Taiwan Songs in the chart issue dated August 20, 2022. In Vietnam, the song debuted at number 13 on the Billboard Vietnam Hot 100 in the chart issue dated August 18, 2022.

In United States, the song debuted at number four on the Billboard World Digital Song Sales in the chart issue dated August 20, 2022. In New Zealand, the song debuted at number 17 on the RMNZ Hot Singles in the chart issue dated August 15, 2022. In Australia, the song debuted at number 17 on the ARIA Top 20 Hitseekers Singles Chart in the chart issue dated July 18, 2022. Globally, the song debuted at number 67 on the Billboard Global 200, and number 41 on the Billboard Global Excl. U.S in the chart issue dated August 20, 2022.

Promotion
Prior to the release of Forever 1, on August 5, 2022, the group held a live event called "Girls' Generation 'Forever 1' Countdown Live" on YouTube and TikTok to introduce the album and its songs, including "Forever 1", and to commemorate their fifteenth anniversary with their fans. Following the album release, they were initially scheduled to perform on two music programs: Mnet's M Countdown on August 11, and SBS's Inkigayo on August 14, however both appearances were cancelled on August 9, due to member Seohyun diagnosed with COVID-19. They subsequently appeared on three music programs: KBS's Music Bank on August 19, MBC's Show! Music Core on August 20, and SBS's Inkigayo on August 21.

Track listing
 Digital download / streaming (iScreaM Vol. 19: Forever 1 Remixes)
 "Forever 1" (Matisse & Sadko remix) – 3:33
 "Forever 1" (Aiobahn remix) – 4:34
 "Forever 1" (Mar Vista remix) – 3:17
 "Forever 1" (Matisse & Sadko remix; extended version) – 4:32
 "Forever 1" (Aiobahn remix; extended version) – 5:40
 "Forever 1" (Mar Vista remix; extended version) – 5:15

Credits and personnel
Credits adapted from the album's liner notes.

Studio
 SM Lvyin Studio – recording, digital editing
 SM Blue Ocean Studio – mixing
 821 Sound Mastering – mastering

Personnel
 SM Entertainment – executive producer
 Lee Soo-man – producer
 Kenzie – producer, director, lyrics, composition, arrangement
 Lee Sung-soo – production director, executive supervisor
 Tak Young-joon – executive supervisor
 Yoo Young-jin – music and sound supervisor
 Girls' Generation – vocals, background vocals
 Ylva Dimberg – background vocals, composition
 Moonshine – arrangement
 Lee Ji-hong – recording, digital editing
 Kim Chul-soon – mixing
 Kwon Nam-woo – mastering

Charts

Weekly charts

Monthly charts

Year-end chart

Accolades

Listicles

Release history

References

Girls' Generation songs
2022 singles
2022 songs
Korean-language songs
SM Entertainment singles
Dance-pop songs
Songs written by Kenzie (songwriter)